Greg Champion  is an Australian songwriter, guitarist, radio personality and athlete.

Biography
Born in Benalla, Victoria, Champion is most recognised for his work as part of the Coodabeen Champions as a songwriter and guitarist. Greg often appears on the program writing songs about both Aussies rules football and cricket.

He is an avid Australian rules football fan, supporting the Adelaide Crows and since the 1980s has penned many tunes on the Australian game. Of these, the most famous is "That's the Thing About Football", which has gone down as a classic Australian rules song, and has been used on Seven Network's Australian Football League coverage.

Greg Champion grew up in Hectorville, a suburb of the South Australian capital, Adelaide.

Beginning in 1983, Champion has appeared on ABC Local Radio as part of the Coodabeens team, singing parodies of popular songs and relating them to Australian rules footballers.

Champion has written hundreds of songs (many serious, many humorous) and is a multi-awarded country/folk singer, who after being discovered in the Catacombs (an Adelaide folk club of the 1970s), went on to form the band Tidewater before launching a successful solo career.

Champion's highest-selling album is the 1995 released Aussie Christmas with Bucko & Champion with Australian country music star Colin Buchanan. In 1998, a sequel to Aussie Christmas with Bucko & Champion 2 was released featuring 25 Christmas-themed songs.

In 2006, his song "Been There, Done That" peaked at number 4 on the Country Music Chart, having been released that year as part of The Shack Tapes.

In 2009, Greg released his album Strayana.

In 2010, Champion was awarded Victorian Male Vocalist in the Victorian Country Music Awards for his song "this was my town (Marysville)".

In 2012, just prior to heading off to his 22nd Tamworth Country Music Festival, he surprised many with his Emergence CD which had a wide range of musical styles of 11 original songs.

In 2017, Champion headlined the All Star Musical Comedy Showcase at the Melbourne International Comedy Festival.

Discography

Studio albums

Compilation albums

Charting singles

Awards and recognition
Champion was awarded the Medal of the Order of Australia (OAM) in the 2022 Queen's Birthday Honours.

ARIA Music Awards
The ARIA Music Awards are a set of annual ceremonies presented by Australian Recording Industry Association (ARIA), which recognise excellence, innovation, and achievement across all genres of the music of Australia. They commenced in 1987.

Country Music Awards of Australia

The Country Music Awards of Australia (CMAA) (also known as the Golden Guitar Awards) is an annual awards night held in January during the Tamworth Country Music Festival, celebrating recording excellence in the Australian country music industry. They have been held annually since 1973.
 (wins only)
|-
| 1994
| "May Your Fridge Be Full of Coldies"
| Video Track of the Year
|

Tamworth Songwriters Awards
The Tamworth Songwriters Association (TSA) is an annual songwriting contest for original country songs, awarded in January at the Tamworth Country Music Festival. They commenced in 1986. Greg Champion has won two awards.
 (wins only)
|-
| 1994
| "May Your Fridge Be Full of Coldies" by Greg Champion 
| Comedy/ Novelty Song of the Year
| 
|-
| 1996
| "Don't Call Wagga Wagga, Wagga" by Greg Champion and Jim Haynes
| Comedy/ Novelty Song of the Year
|

References

External links
Greg Champion site
Coodabeen Champions Official Site

Australian songwriters
Living people
Musicians from Adelaide
Year of birth missing (living people)
ABC radio (Australia) journalists and presenters
Radio personalities from Melbourne
Recipients of the Medal of the Order of Australia